Žrnovnica is a settlement (naselje) in Croatia, administratively part of the city of Split. The population is 3,222 (census 2011).

References

External links

 Where is Zrnovnica on map?

Populated places in Split-Dalmatia County